The Transport Research Institute (TRI) is a transportation science facility at Napier University in Edinburgh, Scotland.

External links
 Official website

Edinburgh Napier University
Transport in Scotland
Research institutes in Edinburgh
Transport research organizations